The Tărhăuș (meaning Bold Alp's Creek) is a left tributary of the river Trotuș in Romania. It discharges into the Trotuș in Tărhăuși.

References

Rivers of Romania
Rivers of Bacău County